Llust'a Q'asa (Quechua llust'a slippery, q'asa mountain pass, "slippery mountain pass", also spelled Llusta Khasa) is a  mountain in the Bolivian Andes. It is located in the Cochabamba Department, Tapacari Province.

References 

Mountains of Cochabamba Department